Dan McIntyre may refer to:

Dan McIntyre (activist) (1950–2001), chair of Ryerson University's Board of Governors and human rights activist
Dan McIntyre (musician), Chicago jazz guitarist

See also
Daniel McIntyre (1852–1946), Winnipeg, Manitoba's first school superintendent